Sovet is a village in Kadamjay District of Batken Region of Kyrgyzstan. Its population was 1,502 in 2021. Until 2012 it was an urban-type settlement.

Nearby towns and villages include Alga, Kyrgyz-Kyshtak (6 miles) and Örükzar.

Population

References

External links 
 Satellite map at Maplandia.com

Populated places in Batken Region